El Casar de Talavera (formerly El Casar del Ciego) is a EATIM ("administrative territorial entity below municipality") and village belonging to the municipality of Talavera de la Reina, province of Toledo, Castilla–La Mancha, Spain.

History 
The place was mentioned in the 1576 Topographic Relations of Philip II. A former municipality, El Casar del Ciego was forced to merge into the municipality of Talavera de la Reina by means of a 1845 law and a 1846 Royal Order. It was thus effectively annexed by Talavera de la Reina on 21 December 1846. El Casar constituted as EATIM on 28 April 2008.

References 
Citations

Bibliography 
 

Talavera de la Reina
Populated places in the Province of Toledo